The 56th Directors Guild of America Awards, honoring the outstanding directorial achievements in films, documentary and television in 2003, were presented on February 7, 2004 at the Hyatt Regency Century Plaza. The ceremony was hosted by Carl Reiner. The nominees in the feature film category were announced on January 6, 2004 and the other nominations starting on January 8, 2004.

Winners and nominees

Film

Television

Commercials

Lifetime Achievement in Feature Film
 Mike Nichols

Frank Capra Achievement Award
 Stephen Glanzrock

Robert B. Aldrich Service Award
 Jeremy Kagan

Franklin J. Schaffner Achievement Award
 Peery Forbis

Honorary Life Member
 Larry Auerbach

References

External links
  

2003 film awards
Directors Guild of America Awards
2003 television awards
Direct
Direct
Directors
Direct
2004 in Los Angeles
February 2004 events in the United States